John Njenga (December 25, 1928 – November 4, 2018) was Roman Catholic archbishop of Mombasa Diocese from 1990 to 2005.

Njenga was born to Peter Kimani and Maria Wanjir in Tigoni, Kiambu District, Kenya and attended Mang’u High School. He was ordained priest at Kibosho Major Seminary in Tanzania in 1957, and was posted to the Nairobi Diocese. In 1970 he was ordained Bishop of Eldoret, and in 1988 Bishop of Mombasa, becoming Archbishop two years later.
Njenga was President of the Kenyan Episcopal Conference, a permanent organisation of Roman Catholic bishops in Kenya, from 1976 until 1982. Archbishop Emeritus John Njenga died on 4 November 2018.

References

Website
https://ajnfoundation.com

Additional sources
 Obituary/Biography
 

1928 births
2018 deaths
20th-century Roman Catholic archbishops in Kenya
Alumni of Mang'u High School
People from Kiambu County
21st-century Roman Catholic archbishops in Kenya
Roman Catholic bishops of Eldoret
Roman Catholic bishops of Mombasa
Roman Catholic archbishops of Mombasa